Andrea Smith may refer to:

Andrea Smith (academic), intellectual, feminist, and anti-violence activist
Andrea Smith (politician), New Zealand politician